Hesham Shehab (born April 20, 1988) is a Bahraini swimmer, who specialized in sprint freestyle events. Shehab qualified for the men's 100 m freestyle, as a 16-year-old, at the 2004 Summer Olympics in Athens, by receiving a Universality place from FINA, in an entry time of 57.44. He challenged six other swimmers in heat one, including 34-year-old Mumtaz Ahmed of Pakistan. He raced to fourth place in 57.94, exactly half a second (0.50) off his entry time. Shehab failed to advance into the semifinals, as he placed sixty-sixth overall out of 71 swimmers in the preliminaries.

References

1988 births
Living people
Bahraini male freestyle swimmers
Olympic swimmers of Bahrain
Swimmers at the 2004 Summer Olympics